James W. Johnson, nicknamed "Lefty", is an American former Negro league pitcher who played in the 1930s.

Johnson made his Negro leagues debut in 1930 with the Memphis Red Sox. He played three seasons with Memphis through 1932.

References

External links
 and Seamheads

Year of birth missing
Place of birth missing
Memphis Red Sox players
Baseball pitchers